João Ribeiro Oliveira (born 3 January 1992) is a Portuguese professional footballer who plays for Penafiel as a midfielder.

Football career
On 2 August 2015, Oliveira made his professional debut with Olhanense in a 2015–16 Taça da Liga match against Penafiel.

On 30 July 2020, Oliveira signed a two-year contract with Polish club Zagłębie Sosnowiec.

References

External links

Stats and profile at LPFP 

1992 births
Sportspeople from Braga
Living people
Portuguese footballers
Association football midfielders
Vilaverdense F.C. players
S.C. Salgueiros players
S.C. Olhanense players
F.C. Vizela players
Académico de Viseu F.C. players
Zagłębie Sosnowiec players
F.C. Penafiel players
Campeonato de Portugal (league) players
Liga Portugal 2 players
I liga players
Portuguese expatriate footballers
Expatriate footballers in Poland
Portuguese expatriate sportspeople in Poland